The Cabinet of South Australia is the chief policy-making organ of the Government of South Australia. In South Australia, the cabinet is interchangeably known as the ministry as there is no "outer ministry" – therefore all ministers are in cabinet. The current fifteen-member cabinet, the Malinauskas ministry, is headed by Premier Peter Malinauskas of the South Australian Labor Party.

Composition of  ministry

As of 24 March 2022. All but one cabinet ministers are members of the South Australian Labor Party, with the remaining cabinet minister an Independent member.

See also
 Malinauskas ministry
 Government of South Australia
 List of South Australian Ministries

References

External links

Government of South Australia